The Sitna is a right tributary of the river Jijia in Romania. It discharges into the Jijia in Hlipiceni. The Sulița Dam is located on the river Sitna.

Tributaries
The following rivers are tributaries to the river Sitna:
Left: Curmătura, Dolina, Urechioiu, Morișca, Burla, Cozancea
Right: Luizoaia, Dresleuca, Dolina, Gornet

References

Rivers of Romania
Rivers of Botoșani County